Electrolux Professional AB is a Swedish multinational professional appliance manufacturing company, headquartered in Stockholm. Originally formed as a division and later subsidiary of Electrolux, it was spun-off in March 2020. It produces a variety of major and small appliances intended for professional consumers, while Electrolux remains more focused toward home consumers.

History 
In January 2018, Electrolux Professional acquired a German-Austrian supplier of laundry rental solutions for professional consumers. In October 2018, Electrolux Professional acquired SPM, an Italian manufacturer of frozen beverage equipment.

In April 2019, Electrolux Professional acquired Unic, a French manufacturer of the espresso machines.

In March 2020, Electrolux Professional has completed its spin-off from Electrolux. As a result, Electrolux Professional has been operated as an independent company and listed on Nasdaq Stockholm under the "EPRO" ticker symbol.

The acquisition was closed in December 2021.

Products 
Electrolux Professional produces a variety of major appliances for professional users, such as commercial kitchen equipments, espresso machines, beverage dispensers, washing machines, dryers, among others.

References

External links 
 

Electrolux
Swedish brands
Manufacturing companies based in Stockholm
Electronics companies established in 1962
Swedish companies established in 1962
Multinational companies headquartered in Sweden
Companies related to the Wallenberg family
2020 initial public offerings
Companies listed on Nasdaq Stockholm
Corporate spin-offs
Electronics companies of Sweden